Ramzi Safouri (sometimes Safury or Safuri, ; born 21 October 1995) is an Israeli professional footballer who plays as a midfielder for Israeli Premier League club Hapoel Be'er Sheva and the Israel national team.

Early life
Safouri was born in Jaffa, Israel, to a Muslim-Arab family.

International career
Safouri was youth international for Israel ever since 2010, where he first played for U-16.

He debuted for the senior Israel national team in a friendly 0–2 away loss against Germany on 26 March 2022, coming in as a 74' minute substitution.

Honours

Club 
Hapoel Be'er Sheva
State Cup: 2019–20, 2021–22
Super Cup: 2022

Notes
 

1995 births
Living people
Footballers from Jaffa
Israeli footballers
Israel international footballers
Israel under-21 international footballers
Arab citizens of Israel
Arab-Israeli footballers
Hapoel Tel Aviv F.C. players
Bnei Sakhnin F.C. players
Hapoel Ashkelon F.C. players
Maccabi Netanya F.C. players
Hapoel Be'er Sheva F.C. players
F.C. Ashdod players
Israeli Premier League players
Association football midfielders
Israeli Muslims